Charles of Valois (12 March 1270 – 16 December 1325), the fourth son of King Philip III of France and Isabella of Aragon, was a member of the House of Capet and founder of the House of Valois, whose rule over France would start in 1328.

Charles ruled several principalities. He held in appanage the counties of Valois, Alençon (1285), and Perche. Through his marriage to his first wife, Margaret, Countess of Anjou and Maine, he became Count of Anjou and Maine. Through his marriage to his second wife, Catherine I of Courtenay, Empress of Constantinople, he was titular Latin Emperor of Constantinople from 1301 to 1307, although he ruled from exile and only had authority over Crusader States in Greece.

As the grandson of King Louis IX of France, Charles of Valois was a son, brother, brother-in-law and son-in-law of kings or queens (of France, Navarre, England and Naples). His descendants, the House of Valois, would become the royal house of France three years after his death, beginning with his eldest son King Philip VI of France.

Life
Besides holding in appanage the counties of Valois, Alençon and Perche, Charles became in 1290 the Count of Anjou and of Maine by his first marriage with Margaret of Anjou, the eldest daughter of King Charles II of Naples, titular King of Sicily; by a second marriage that he contracted with the heiress of Emperor Baldwin II of Constantinople, last Latin emperor of Constantinople, he also had pretensions to the throne of Constantinople.

From his early years, Charles of Valois dreamed of more and sought all his life for a crown he never obtained. Starting in 1284, Pope Martin IV recognized him as King of Aragon (under the vassalage of the Holy See), as the son of his mother, Isabella of Aragon, in opposition to King Peter III of Aragon, who after the conquest of the island of Sicily was an enemy of the Papacy. Charles hence married Margaret, the daughter of the Neapolitan king, in order to re-enforce his position in Sicily which was supported by the Pope. Thanks to this Aragonese Crusade undertaken by his father King Philip III against the advice of his elder brother Philip the Fair, he believed he would win a kingdom and however won nothing but the ridicule of having been crowned with a cardinal's hat in 1285, which gave him the alias of the "King of the Cap." He would never dare to use the royal seal which was made on this occasion and had to renounce the title.

His principal quality was to be a good military leader. Charles commanded effectively in Flanders in 1297. Thus his elder brother, King Philip IV of France, quickly deduced that Charles could conduct an expedition in Italy against King Frederick III of Sicily. The affair was ended by the Treaty of Caltabellotta.

Dreaming at the same time for an imperial crown, Charles married secondly to Catherine I of Courtenay in 1301, who was the titular Empress of Constantinople. But it needed the connivance of Pope Boniface VIII, which he obtained by his expedition to Italy, where the Pope supported Charles's father-in-law King Charles II against King Frederick III, his cousin. Named papal vicar, Charles of Valois lost himself in the complexity of Italian politics, was compromised in a massacre at Florence, and in sordid financial extremities, reached Sicily where he consolidated his reputation as a looter and finally returned to France discredited in 1301–1302.

Charles was back in shape to seek a new crown when the German King Albert I of Germany was murdered in 1308.  Charles's brother King Philip IV, who did not wish to take the risk himself of a check and probably thought that a French puppet on the imperial throne would be a good thing for France, encouraged him.  The candidacy was defeated with the election of Henry VII of Luxembourg as German king, for the electors did not want France to become even more powerful. Charles thus continued to dream of the eastern crown of the Courtenays.

He did benefit from the affection which his brother King Philip, who had suffered from the remarriage of their father, brought to his only full brother, and Charles thus found himself given responsibilities which largely exceeded his talent.  Thus it was he who directed, in 1311, the royal embassy to the conferences of Tournai with the Flemish; he quarreled there with his brother's chamberlain Enguerrand de Marigny, who openly defied him.  Charles did not pardon the affront and would continue the vendetta against Marigny after his brother King Philip's death.

In 1314, Charles was doggedly opposed to the torture of Jacques de Molay, grand master of the Templars.

The premature death of Charles's nephew, King Louis X of France, in 1316, gave Charles hopes for a political role. However, he could not prevent his nephew Philip the Tall from taking the regency while awaiting the birth of his brother King Louis X's posthumous son.  When that son (John I of France) died after a few days, Philip took the throne as King Philip V of France. Charles was initially opposed to his nephew Philip's succession, for Philip's elder brother King Louis X had left behind a daughter, Joan of France, his only surviving child. However, Charles later switched sides and eventually backed his nephew Philip, probably realizing that Philip's precedent would bring him and his line closer to the throne.

In 1324, Charles commanded with success the army of his nephew, King Charles IV of France (who succeeded his elder brother King Philip V in 1322), to take Guyenne and Flanders from King Edward II of England. He contributed, by the capture of several cities, to accelerate the peace, which was concluded between the King of France and his sister Isabella, the queen-consort of England as the wife of King Edward II.

The Count of Valois died on 16 December 1325 at Nogent-le-Roi, leaving a son who would take the throne of France under the name of Philip VI and commence the branch of the Valois. Had he survived for three more years and outlived his nephew King Charles IV, Charles might have become king of France. Charles was buried in the now-demolished church of the Couvent des Jacobins in Paris – his effigy is now in the Basilica of St Denis.

Marriages and children

Charles was married three times.

His first marriage in Aug 1290, was to Margaret, Countess of Anjou and Maine (1272–1299), daughter of King Charles II of Naples. They had the following children:
 Isabella of Valois (1292 – 1309); married John, who would become Duke of Brittany.
 Philip VI of France (1293 – 22 August 1350), first king of the Valois Dynasty.
 Joan of Valois, Countess of Hainaut (1294 – 7 March 1342); married Count William I of Hainaut and had issue.
 Margaret of Valois, Countess of Blois (1295 – July 1342); married Count Guy I of Blois, and had issue.
 Charles II, Count of Alençon (1297 – 26 August 1346 at the Battle of Crécy), also Count of Perche, Chatres and Joigny. Married firstly Jeanne de Joigny, Countess of Joigny, and secondly Marie de la Cerda, the youngest daughter of Fernando de la Cerda, Lord of Lara.
 Catherine (1299 – died young).

In 1302 he married Catherine I of Courtenay (1274–1307), titular Latin Empress of Constantinople. She was the daughter of Philip I, Emperor of Constantinople. They had:
 John (1302 – 1308), Count of Chartres.
 Catherine II of Valois (1303 – October 1346), succeeded as titular Empress of Constantinople and Princess of Achaea. She married Prince Philip I of Taranto and had issue.
 Joan of Valois, Countess of Beaumont-le-Roger (1304 – 9 July 1363); married Robert III of Artois, Count of Beaumont-le-Roger and had issue.
 Isabelle of Valois (1305 – 11 November 1349), Abbess of Fontevrault.

Finally, in 1308, he married Mahaut of Châtillon (1293–1358), daughter of Guy IV of Châtillon, Count of Saint-Pol. They had:
 Marie of Valois, Duchess of Calabria (1309 – 28 October 1332); married Duke Charles of Calabria and had issue.
 Isabella of Valois, Duchess of Bourbon (1313 – 26 July 1383). She married Duke Peter I of Bourbon.
 Blanche of Valois, Queen of Germany and Bohemia (1317 – 1348); married King Charles IV of Germany and Bohemia who later became Holy Roman Emperor after her death. She was sometimes called "Marguerite".
 Louis (1318 – 2 November 1328), Count of Chartres and Lord of Châteauneuf-en-Thymerais.

In fiction
Charles is a major character in Les Rois maudits (The Accursed Kings), a series of French historical novels by Maurice Druon.

References

Sources

External links
 Brown University History Page on Charles of Valois
 Britannica entry on Charles of Valois
 GJGFrench Wikipedia page on Charles de Valois (fr)
 Historia Nostra page on Charles de Valois (fr)

|-

|-

Valois, Charles of
Valois, Charles of
14th-century Latin Emperors of Constantinople
Remarried royal consorts
House of Capet
House of Valois
Valois, Charles of
Counts of Anjou
Charles Valois
Valois, Charles of
Valois, Charles of
People of the War of the Sicilian Vespers
Heirs presumptive to the French throne
13th-century French people
14th-century French people
13th-century peers of France
14th-century peers of France
Sons of kings
Burials at the Basilica of Saint-Denis
Non-inheriting heirs presumptive